Native Americans on Network TV: Stereotypes, Myths, and the "Good Indian," is a 2013 book-length study of American Indian characters on U.S. television, from The Lone Ranger to Longmire.

Author Michael Ray FitzGerald  noted a persistent pattern: The most notable (i.e., long-running) characters, such as Tonto (The Lone Ranger), Cochise (Broken Arrow), Mingo (Daniel Boone), and Cordell Walker (Walker, Texas Ranger) have been those who enforced Euro-American norms. The book examines the traditional role of stereotypes and their functions in the rhetoric of colonialism, offering a critical analysis of images of the "Good Indian"—minority figures who enforce the dominant group's norms. All of these, FitzGerald argues, are variations of Defoe's Carib character Friday from his 1719 novel Robinson Crusoe. A framework for this and other closely related stereotypes was formulated by University of Pennsylvania communication scholar Cedric C. Clark (later known as Syed M. Khatib) in a 1969 article for Television Quarterly.

See also
Inventing the Indian (2014)

References

Books about television
Books about media bias
Indigenous peoples in the United States
Native American topics
Native Americans in popular culture
History of civil rights in the United States
Social history of the United States
American non-fiction books
2013 non-fiction books
Rowman & Littlefield books